Toau,  Pakuria, or Taha-a-titi is a coral atoll in French Polynesia, one of the Palliser Islands (Îles Pallisier). Toau has a wide lagoon; length , width .

Toau Atoll had a population of 18 in 2012. The main village is called Maragai.

Historical facts
Captain James Cook was the first recorded European to sight the atoll, in April 1774. In some maps Toau appears as "Elizabeth".

Administration
Toau Atoll belongs to the commune of Fakarava, which consists of Fakarava, as well as the atolls of Aratika, Kauehi, Niau, Raraka, Taiaro and Toau.

References

Pictures
Island names

External links
Atoll list (in French)

Atolls of the Tuamotus